The  Minister for Active Transport is a minister in the Government of New South Wales who has responsibilities for active transport (cycling and pedestrian movement) including cycleways and footpaths.

The current Minister for Active Transport is Rob Stokes, who is also the Minister for Infrastructure and Minister for Cities, and was sworn in on 21 December 2021. In the second Perrottet ministry since December 2021, it is one of the six ministries in the transport sector and the Minister (for Infrastructure, Cities and Active Transport) works with the Minister for Transport, the Minister for Metropolitan Roads and the Minister for Regional Transport and Roads. Together they administer the portfolio through the Department of Transport (Transport for NSW) and a range of other government agencies that coordinate funding arrangements for transport operators, including hundreds of local and community transport operators.

Roles and responsibilities
Active transport concerns the transport of people or goods, through non-motorized means, based around human physical activity. While cycling is considered separately, pedestrians also includes other modes such as skateboarding, kick scooters, roller blades and roller skates. 

The portfolio was created in the second Perrottet ministry. The minister's responsibilities are held jointly with the portfolios of Planning and Cities. These include 
 Callan Park
 Centennial Park and Moore Park;
 Newcastle National Park, including the Number 1 Sports Ground;
 Parramatta Park and Old Government House;
 Royal Botanic Gardens and The Domain;
 Sydney Olympic Park; and
 Western Sydney Parklands.

List of ministers

See also 

List of New South Wales government agencies

References

External links 
Transport for New South Wales

Active Transport